Jean Baptiste Waitreü (born 23 January 1997) is a New Caledonian international footballer who plays as a forward for New Caledonia Super Ligue side Gaïtcha FCN.

Career statistics

International

International goals
Scores and results list New Caledonia's goal tally first.

References

1997 births
Living people
New Caledonian footballers
New Caledonia international footballers
Association football forwards
Gaïtcha FCN players